Cari Domínguez may refer to:

 Cari M. Dominguez, Chair of the U.S. Equal Employment Opportunity Commission
 Cari Domínguez (handballer) (born 1992), Dominican handball player